Jeff Strom  is a footballer who represented New Zealand at international level.

Strom made his full All Whites debut in a 5–1 win over Kuwait on 16 October 1980 and ended his international playing career with 14 A-international caps to his credit, his final cap an appearance in a 1–1 draw with Sudan on 9 June 1983.

References 

Year of birth missing (living people)
Living people
Wellington United players
New Zealand association footballers
New Zealand international footballers
Association footballers not categorized by position